Altiphylax is a genus of small species of geckos, lizards in the family Gekkonidae. Species of the genus are endemic to Central Asia.

Species
The following five species are recognized as being valid:
Altiphylax baturensis   – Batura Glacier gecko
Altiphylax levitoni  – Leviton's gecko
Altiphylax mintoni  
Altiphylax stoliczkai 
Altiphylax tokobajevi  

Nota bene: A binomial authority in parentheses indicates that the species was originally described in a genus other than Altiphylax.

References

 
Lizard genera